Thout 12 - Coptic Calendar - Thout 14

The thirteenth day of the Coptic month of Thout, the first month of the Coptic year. On a common year, this day corresponds to September 10, of the Julian Calendar, and September 23, of the Gregorian Calendar. This day falls in the Coptic season of Akhet, the season of inundation.

Commemorations

Feasts 

 Coptic New Year Period

Saints 
 The departure of Pope Matthew II, the ninetieth Patriarch of the See of Saint Mark

Other commemorations 
 The commemoration of the miracle performed by Saint Basil the Great, Bishop of Caesarea Cappadocia

References 

Days of the Coptic calendar